Consort Yujiulü may refer to:

Consort Yujiulü (Northern Yan) ( 414), concubine of Feng Ba 
Lu Zuo Zhaoyi (died after 430), concubine of Emperor Taiwu of Northern Wei
Empress Gong (died 452), Tuoba Huang's wife and Emperor Wencheng of Northern Wei's mother
Empress Yujiulü (525–540), wife of Emperor Wen of Western Wei
Princess Linhe (537–550), wife of Emperor Wucheng of Northern Qi before he became an emperor